GT Pro Series is a racing video game developed by MTO and published by Ubisoft as a launch title for Wii. It includes over 80 licensed Japanese cars, next-gen physics and many gameplay modes, including Championship, Quick Race, Time Attack, Versus (4 players), Drift, and Replay.
Graphically, the game uses a cel-shaded style.

Critics have noted that the graphics are generally underwhelming, according to IGN. This is because the visuals are largely ported from the older GameCube game GT Cube with minor updates. GT Cube was released in Japan in 2003 for the Nintendo GameCube.

Gameplay
GT Pro Series features eighty Japanese cars from various companies, including Honda, Subaru, Toyota, and Nissan. The tracks are in the same vein as those found in the Gran Turismo series of games, but are of a less overall graphical quality.

The game features cel-shaded cars driving in more realistic settings.

Wii Steering Wheel
As with Monster 4x4: World Circuit, a steering wheel shell for the Wii Remote is bundled with the game. The peripheral steering wheel is created by Thrustmaster. Other games, such as Mario Kart Wii, which are controlled by turning (but not tilting) the Wii Remote can be used with this peripheral as well.

Development
GT Pro Series was first purchased by Ubisoft on August 3, 2006. By September, GameSpot was able to get a glimpse of the game through a small video demo, reporting that though the cars looked cartoonish, they still had a certain realistic flair to them. A few weeks later, GameSpot looked at the game again, and walked away "impressed with the controls." IGN also looked in-depth at the game, commenting on the high quality of the control schemes. Both sites later gave poor marks to the game in their reviews of the final product.

Reception

GT Pro Series received "generally unfavorable reviews" according to video game review aggregator Metacritic.  In Japan, Famitsu gave it a score of one six, two sevens and one five, for a total of 25 out of 40.

GameSpot criticized the game's graphics and audio, writing, "The visual presentation in GT Pro Series looks like something from the Nintendo 64 era, and the sound isn't any better." IGN denounced the gameplay, stating, "GT Pro Series feels like a quick cash-out title, and Wii players deserve better." Eurogamer pointed out how the game shows serious problems for any future serious racers on the Wii, while commenting that the game itself was "absolutely, unequivocally, shockingly awful."

See also
GT Cube

References

External links

2006 video games
MTO (video game company) games
Multiplayer and single-player video games
Racing video games
Video games developed in Japan
Video games with cel-shaded animation
Wii games
Wii Wheel games
Wii-only games